Perham may refer to:

People
 Joe Perham (1932–2013), American humorist
 Linda Perham (born 1947), English politician
 Margery Perham (1895–1982), English historian
 Michael Perham (bishop) (1947–2017), Church of England bishop
 Michael Perham (born 1992), English sailor
 Richard Perham (1937–2015), English molecular biologist
 Sidney Perham (1819-1907), American politician

Places

United Kingdom 
 Perham Down, England

United States 
 Perham, Maine
 Perham, Minnesota
 Perham Township, Otter Tail County, Minnesota